Luhr or Luhrs may refer to:

People
 Fredrik Luhr Dietrichson (b. 1988), a Norwegian musician
 Grant Luhrs, an American musician and a member of the duo Luhrs & Crawford
 Henry E. Luhrs, former owner of the Beistle Company
 Jake Luhrs (b. 1985), an American musician
 Jorge Avendaño Lührs, a Mexican musician
 Katarina Luhr (born 1973), Swedish politician
 Lucas Luhr (b. 1979), a German factory racing driver
 Simon Luhrs (b. 1970), an Australian footballer
 William Luhr, an American author

Places
 Luhrs Building, a historic building in Phoenix, Arizona
 Luhrs Tower, a skyscraper office building in Phoenix, Arizona